Leon Moore (8 February 1871 – 11 September 1934) was an Australian cricketer. He played eleven first-class matches for New South Wales between 1892/93 and 1894/95.

Moore was a son of Jemmy Moore who represented New South Wales at State level in cricket. He began his cricket career playing for the Pearl Club in Maitland and he topped the clubs batting average for four consecutive seasons and in the 1892/93 club season he came to prominence by averaging 70.4 with the bat with a top score of 149 not out and taking 24 wickets at an average of 10.54. He played his first First-class match that season in which he scored fourteen in two hours, stonewalling at the instruction of Alec Bannerman. He toured New Zealand with a NSW team in 1893/94 and later toured Queensland with a private team during which he scored 432 runs. When district cricket was established in NSW the Pearls cricket club was disbanded and Moore began playing for East End in district cricket. NSW cricket reverted to a club system at some point and he played for Standards and then Robins.

Moore's New South Wales State career ended in 1895 when he moved to Fremantle, Western Australia, and a benefit cricket match was played for him with an accompanying concert in Maitland as a farewell. He returned to Maitland after a short time, and renewed his association with the Robins cricket club, and lived in the town for the rest of his life. He died after a ten day illness in 1934.

See also
 List of New South Wales representative cricketers

References

External links
 

1871 births
1934 deaths
Australian cricketers
New South Wales cricketers
People from Maitland, New South Wales
Cricketers from New South Wales